Avaya Holdings Corporation, often shortened to Avaya, is an American multinational technology company headquartered in Durham, North Carolina, that provides cloud communications and workstream collaboration services. The company's platform includes unified communications (UCaaS), contact center other services. The company provides services to 220,000 customer locations in 190 countries.

History
In 1995, Lucent Technologies was spun off from AT&T, and Lucent subsequently spun off units of its own in an attempt to restructure its struggling operations.[7]

Avaya was then spun off from Lucent as its own company in 2000 (Lucent merged with Alcatel SA in 2006, becoming Alcatel-Lucent, which was purchased in turn by Nokia in 2016). It remained a public company from 2000 to 2007. In October 2007, Avaya was acquired by two private-equity firms, TPG Capital and Silver Lake Partners, for $8.2 billion.

On January 19, 2017, Avaya filed for Chapter 11 bankruptcy.

On December 15, 2017, it once again became a public company, trading under the NYSE stock ticker AVYA.

On February 14, 2023, Avaya once again filed for Chapter 11 bankruptcy.

Management 
President & CEO - Alan Masarek
Interim Chief Financial Officer - Becky Roof
Executive Vice President - Shefali Shah
Senior Vice President, Engineering - Todd Zerbe

Acquisitions and partnerships
Since 2001, Avaya has sold and acquired several companies. Through Nortel's bankruptcy proceedings, assets related to their Enterprise Voice and Data business units were auctioned. Avaya placed a $900 million bid, and was announced as the winner of the assets on September 14, 2009. In 1985, Performance Engineering Corporation (later PEC Solutions) was formed to offer technology services to government customers. On June 6, 2005, Nortel acquired PEC Solutions to form Nortel PEC Solutions. On January 18, 2006, Nortel PEC Solutions was renamed Nortel Government Solutions. On December 21, 2009, Avaya acquired Nortel's government business as part of the company's assets sale.

In October 2019, Avaya entered into a strategic partnership with RingCentral and together, introduced a new unified communications as a service solution called Avaya Cloud Office ( "ACO"). RingCentral also contributed $500 million to be the exclusive provider of the new Avaya UCaaS offer.

Locations and customers
Avaya's headquarters are located at 2605 Meridien Parkway, Durham, North Carolina. In 2020, the company had a presence in approximately 190 countries.

The company claims that its cloud services are utilized by over 90% of the Fortune 100 organizations.

Avaya enterprise customers include: Apple, AT&T, Dell, CVS Health, as well as government orginizations.

Avaya sponsors the IAUG users' group and training programs for IT professional certification in the use of Avaya's products.

Avaya provides business related equipment for its customers with Cameras, Collaboration Units, Conference Phones, Headsets, IP Phones, Room Systems, Vantage, and Wireless Handsets. These devices are compatible with various options for the three services provided to its customers as Avaya Cloud Office, Avaya Spaces, and Avaya UCaaS.

Patents
Avaya has over 4,400 patents and patents pending. In January 2021, the company disclosed it had received its 600th patent for Contact Center technologies, which was granted for AI in "chatbot socialization."

Controversy
During the 2022 Russian invasion of Ukraine, Avaya refused to join the international community and withdraw from the Russian market. Research from Yale University updated on April 28, 2022, identifying how companies were reacting to Russia's invasion identified Avaya as one of the "Companies that are scaling back some significant business operations but continuing some others...".

References

External links
 

Official Canadian partner site

 
2000 establishments in California
2007 mergers and acquisitions
Alcatel-Lucent
American companies established in 2000
Companies based in Santa Clara, California
Electronics companies established in 2000
Multinational companies headquartered in the United States
Networking companies of the United States
Networking hardware companies
Companies formerly listed on the New York Stock Exchange
Companies traded over-the-counter in the United States
Software companies based in the San Francisco Bay Area
Software companies established in 2000
Technology companies based in the San Francisco Bay Area
Telecommunications companies established in 2000
Telecommunications companies of the United States
Telecommunications equipment vendors
TPG Capital companies
Videotelephony
VoIP companies of the United States
2011 initial public offerings
Companies that filed for Chapter 11 bankruptcy in 2017
Companies that filed for Chapter 11 bankruptcy in 2023
2018 initial public offerings
Software companies of the United States